St Bernadette Catholic Secondary School is a coeducational Catholic, voluntary aided secondary school in Whitchurch, a suburb in the south of Bristol, England. It is located next to St Bernadette Catholic Primary School and the local parish church.

History
St Berns, as the school is colloquially known, was founded in 1958 and named after Saint Bernadette. It was the second new Catholic school established in Bristol after World War II. In 2009-10 it underwent renovation through the "Building Schools for the Future" programme.

Academic achievement
St. Bernadette's is a specialist school for maths and ICT.

The school has improved its results between the period 2008 to 2011 and achieved its best ever GCSE scores in 2011, the table below shows the percentage of students hitting the key measure of 5 A*-C including English and Mathematics.

Notable former pupils
 Dawn Bowden, Welsh Labour politician and Member of the Welsh Assembly for Merthyr Tydfil and Rhymney
 Claudia Fragapane, Olympic Gymnast
Tommy Doherty, footballer
 Neil Palmer, Writer
 Bobby Hodges, Dancer

References

External links
Official website
ICT Faciluty

Catholic secondary schools in the Diocese of Clifton
Secondary schools in Bristol
Voluntary aided schools in England